Acid Mothers Temple & The Pink Ladies Blues featuring the Sun Love and the Heavy Metal Thunder is an album by Acid Mothers Temple under one of their many aliases.  This album was recorded by three members of the Acid Mothers Temple who are not main members of the original group. This is the only Acid Mothers Temple incarnation to not include Makoto Kawabata.

Track listing
 Sandoza Death Blues (Mai Mai, Magic Aum Gigi) – 19:06
 The Tale of the Garden Of Sandoza (Magic Aum Gigi) – 1:57
 Rock On Brain (Tsuchy, Mai Mai, Magic Aum Gigi) – 3:02
 Acid Mothers Rock'N'Roll (Tsuchy, Mai Mai, Magic Aum Gigi) – 13:14
 Freaks Your Mind & Your LSD Piss Will Follow (Tsuchy, Mai Mai, Magic Aum Gigi) – 28:15
 Là-Bas (Magic Aum Gigi) – 9:24

Musicians
 Mai Mai – drum, harmonica, theremin, maracas, vocals
 Magic Aum Gigi – guitar, theremin, percussion, vocals
 Tsuchy – guitar

2006 albums
Acid Mothers Temple albums